Zhang Xuelong (born 3 January 1988 in Shijiazhuang) is a Paralympian athlete from China competing mainly in category F37 throwing events.

Zhang won a silver medal in the F37/38 javelin at the 2008 Summer Paralympics in his home country of China he also competed in the F37/38 discus.

References

External links
 

Paralympic athletes of China
Athletes (track and field) at the 2008 Summer Paralympics
Paralympic silver medalists for China
Living people
1988 births
Chinese male discus throwers
Chinese male javelin throwers
Medalists at the 2008 Summer Paralympics
Paralympic medalists in athletics (track and field)
21st-century Chinese people
Sportspeople from Shijiazhuang
Medalists at the 2010 Asian Para Games
World Para Athletics Championships winners